EVO: Endgame is an American crossover comic book storyline by Image Comics and Top Cow Productions featuring Witchblade and Lara Croft. It ran from September 2002 to February 2003.

Publication history
The story appeared in the following order:
 Preludes: Witchblade #58-59 (by writer David Wohl, with pencils by Brian Ching, September–October 2002)
 Part One: Tomb Raider #25 (by writer Michael Turner, with pencils by Jonathan Sibal/Billy Tan, November 2002)
 Part Two: Witchblade #60 (by writer David Wohl, with pencils by Francis Manapul, November 2002)
 Part Three: EVO (by Marc Silvestri/David Wohl and Eric Basaldua/Marc Silvestri/Billy Tan,  February 2003)
 Epilogue: Witchblade #61 (by writer David Wohl, with pencils by Romano Molenaar, February 2003)

Collection
 Endgame (160 pages, July 2007)

References

Top Cow titles
Works based on Tomb Raider
Witchblade